The ATP Challenger Tour in 2022 was the secondary professional tennis circuit organized by the ATP. The 2022 ATP Challenger Tour calendar comprised 184 tournaments with prize money ranging from $37,520 up to $159,360. It was the 45th edition of challenger tournaments cycle, and 14th under the name of Challenger Tour.

Schedule 
This was the complete schedule of events on the 2022 calendar, with player progression documented from the quarterfinals stage.

January

February

March

April

May

June

July

August

September

October

November

Cancelled tournaments
The following tournaments were formally announced by the ATP before being cancelled.

Statistical information 
These tables present the number of singles (S) and doubles (D) titles won by each player and each nation during the season. The players/nations are sorted by: 1) total number of titles (a doubles title won by two players representing the same nation counts as only one win for the nation); 2) a singles > doubles hierarchy; 3) alphabetical order (by family names for players).

To avoid confusion and double counting, these tables should be updated only after an event is completed.

Titles won by player

Titles won by nation

Point distribution 
Points were awarded as follows:

See also
 2022 ATP Tour
 2022 ITF Men's World Tennis Tour
 2022 WTA 125 tournaments

Notes

References

External links 
 Official website
 Calendar

ATP Challenger Tour
 
ATP Challenger Tour